The 1939 Giro d'Italia was the 27th edition of the Giro d'Italia, organized and sponsored by the newspaper La Gazzetta dello Sport. The race was won by the Italian rider Giovanni Valetti of the Fréjus team, with fellow Italians Gino Bartali and Mario Vicini coming in second and third respectively.

Valetti had the lead halfway the race. Bartali then took over the lead in the mountains, but Valetti took it back in the penultimate stage. Bartali attacked on the last stage, but Valetti stayed in his wake and won the race.

Participants

Of the 89 riders that began the Giro d'Italia on 28 April, 54 of them made it to the finish in Milan on 18 May. Riders were allowed to ride as a member of a team or group; 56 riders competed as part of a team, while the remaining 33 competed as a part of a group. The eight teams that partook in the race were: Bianchi, Fréjus, Ganna, Gloria, Legnano, Lygie, Olympia, and Belgium. The teams ranged from six to eight riders each. There were also seven groups, made up of three to five riders each, that participated in the race. Those groups were: U.S. Azzini, Dopolavoro Di Novi, S.S. Genova 1913, Il Littoriale, La Voce Di Mantova, U.C. Modenese, and S.C. Vigor.

The peloton was composed primarily of Italian riders. The field featured three former Giro d'Italia winners with two-time winner Gino Bartali, Vasco Bergamaschi who won the 1935 edition, and reigning champion Giovanni Valetti. Other notable Italian riders included Olimpio Bizzi, Ezio Cecchi, and Cino Cinelli.

Route and stages

Classification leadership

The leader of the general classification – calculated by adding the stage finish times of each rider – wore a pink jersey. This classification is the most important of the race, and its winner is considered as the winner of the Giro.

In the mountains classification, the race organizers selected different mountains that the route crossed and awarded points to the riders who crossed them first.

The winner of the team classification was determined by adding the finish times of the best three cyclists per team together and the team with the lowest total time was the winner. If a team had fewer than three riders finish, they were not eligible for the classification. The group classification was decided in the same manner, but the classification was exclusive to the competing groups.

The rows in the following table correspond to the jerseys awarded after that stage was run.

Final standings

General classification

Group rider classification

Mountains classification

Team classification

Group classification

References

Notes

Citations

1939
Giro d'Italia
Giro d'Italia
Giro d'Italia
Giro d'Italia